The Institut Constant de Rebecque is a Swiss free-market, classical liberal and libertarian think tank founded in January 2005 in Lausanne, named after writer and political philosopher Benjamin Constant. It is active in issues such as institutional competition, tax policy, health care and education.

Articles from its members have appeared in Bilan (Swiss economic bi-monthly), Le Temps, L'Agefi and Tech Central Station. In October 2005, it launched the Center for Tax Competition, a monitoring and analytical center on tax policy. It has also collaborated on some projects with another Swiss classical liberal think tank, the Liberales Institut.

Members
Pierre Bessard, Founder and Executive Director
Victoria Curzon-Price, Academic Director
Alphonse Crespo, Research Director
Jan Krepelka, Research Fellow
François Longchamp, Research Fellow
Paolo Pamini, Research Fellow

References

External links 
Official website
Website of the Center for Tax Competition

Think tanks based in Switzerland
Classical liberalism
Political and economic think tanks based in Europe
Libertarian think tanks
Libertarianism in Switzerland